Leptoctenus byrrhus is a species of wandering spider in the family Ctenidae. It is found in the United States and Mexico.

References

Ctenidae
Articles created by Qbugbot
Spiders described in 1888